Rumatha glaucatella is a species of snout moth in the genus Rumatha. It was described by George Duryea Hulst in 1888. It is found in North America, including southern Texas and Florida.

The wingspan is 15–18 mm for males and 16–20 mm for females. The palpi, head and thorax are pale fuscous, sparsely sprinkled with white. The forewings are dull white, sparsely sprinkled with fuscous and with a very pale fuscous stain. The hindwings are whitish with a very pale fuscous line edging the termen.

The larvae feed on Cylindropuntia species, including Cylindropuntia leptocaulis. They are solitary feeders within the terminal segments of the stem of their host plant. The larvae are whitish. Pupation takes within the feeding tunnels.

References

Moths described in 1888
Phycitinae